High Trestle Trail is a rail trail running from Ankeny to Woodward in central Iowa. The recreation trail opened on April 30, 2011.  It is a paved recreational trail that runs through the Polk, Story, Boone, and Dallas counties. The trail's name is derived from a former 1913 bridge that spanned the Des Moines River between the towns of Madrid and Woodward.

Conservation board directors and the Iowa Natural Heritage Foundation estimate that more than 3,000 people use this trail each week. The trail is a major component of a planned pair of 100-mile (160 km) loops that will meet near Des Moines.

Development

The High Trestle Trail follows the route of a former Union Pacific Railroad (UPRR) freight line between Woodward and Ankeny, Iowa. UPRR first proposed retiring the line in 2003. The lowa Natural Heritage Foundation (INHF), which had organized other rail-trail projects in Iowa, bought the  corridor from UPRR in 2005. As part of the transaction, UPRR donated over $3 million of land value. INHF then transferred sections of the land to partner agencies in the five cities and four counties within the corridor.

Construction on the trail, designed by engineering firm Snyder and Associates, Inc. began in early 2006 to include  of trail in Woodward. In 2007, bookend projects in Woodward and Ankeny were constructed. The catalyst for construction came from a $5.6 million Congressional appropriation in 2005. With the help of additional state and federal grants, 20 additional miles of trail were completed and opened to the public in 2008.

The last portion to be completed was the high bridge over the Des Moines River. A $1.75 million grant from Vision Iowa, a project of the Iowa Economic Development Authority, helped fund the construction of a new bridge superstructure designed by Shuck-Britson, Inc., and artwork by RDG Dahlquist Art Studio. The project was officially completed with the grand opening of the bridge in April 2011. Following its completion, the trail was awarded a Mid American Energy Trails and Greenways project award that October.

Trestle bridge

The 13-story-high (40-meter) and nearly half-mile-long (770-meter) trestle bridge provides scenic views of the Des Moines River Valley and is located near mining shafts that were worked by Italian immigrant families and others who settled nearby. The bridge decking incorporates a decorative structure that represents the view through a mine shaft, and its design includes decorative lighting that remains on until 10:30 pm in the summer and 9:00 pm in the winter.

The bridge was originally built in the 1970s to carry rail traffic on a Milwaukee Road line. With the retirement of that rail line in the early 2000s, the original bridge deck was removed, and its steel I-beams were reused for a new Union Pacific bridge in Boone. However, the piers (or trestles) remained in place, and the original piers now support a new deck designed for pedestrian and bicycle traffic. Between the removal of the original decking and the construction of its replacement, the single-file line of unconnected concrete piers was informally known as "Iowa's Stonehenge".

On April 2, 2015, the BBC showcased the High Trestle Trail Bridge as part of a globe-spanning collection of eight eye-catching footbridges.

Trailheads

These are the trailheads:
Ankeny
Sheldahl
Slater
Madrid
Woodward

Connections to other recreational trails

The High Trestle Trail connects at Slater to the  Heart of Iowa Nature Trail in Story and Marshall counties.  A connection to Des Moines is planned via Big Creek State Park and the  Neal Smith Trail.  A third connection is planned between Woodward and Perry to the  Raccoon River Valley Trail.

The High Trestle Trail lies between two  recreational trail loops near Des Moines. The western loop involves the Raccoon River Valley Trail and the Clive Greenbelt Trail. The eastern loop includes the Heart of Iowa Nature Trail, the Chichaqua Valley Trail and the Gay Lea Wilson Trail.

As of May 2021, a spur trail is planned to connect the High Trestle Trail from Woodward through Granger to the  Jester Park located along the western shore of the  Saylorville Lake. South of the Saylorville Dam is a trail, which is known as "the connector", that connects the Neil Smith Trail and the Ankeny trails system. The Neil Smith and John Pat Dorrian Trails connect southward along the east side of the Des Moines River from the Big Creek Lake marina, through Polk City, Saylorville Lake, the Birdland Marina, and the Des Moines Botanical Center to the  Grays Lake Park located just south of downtown Des Moines in the greater Des Moines trails system.

See also
List of rail trails
Raccoon River Valley Trail

References

External links
High Trestle Trail - Iowa Natural Heritage Foundation (INHF) website
Daytime photos of the bridge art RDg Dahlquist Art Studios website
Nighttime photos of the bridge art RDg Dahlquist Art Studios website
High Trestle Trail Map Polk County Conservation Board website
Map of High Trestle Trail with connections to other trails (pdf) Iowa Natural Heritage Foundation (INHF) website
High Trestle Trail Polk County Conservation Board website
High Trestle Trail Bridge Documentary produced by Iowa Public Television
Central Iowa Trail System
Central Iowa Trails Network - overview
Heart of Iowa Nature Trail - Iowa Natural Heritage Foundation (INHF) website
Neal Smith Trail - Iowa Natural Heritage Foundation (INHF) website
 Raccoon River Valley Trail - Iowa Natural Heritage Foundation (INHF) website
Raccoon River Valley Trail - Chuck Offenburger's website
Bike Iowa
Envision Woodward! website

Rail trails in Iowa
Protected areas of Polk County, Iowa
Protected areas of Story County, Iowa
Protected areas of Boone County, Iowa
Protected areas of Dallas County, Iowa
Ankeny, Iowa
2011 establishments in Iowa